Mount Richardson is a mountain just west of Reece Pass and  south of Mount Colombo in the southeast part of the Fosdick Mountains, in the Ford Ranges of Marie Byrd Land, Antarctica.

Discovered on aerial flights from West Base of the United States Antarctic Service Expedition (USAS) (1939–41) and named for Harrison H. Richardson, meteorological observer with the biological party which visited this area in 1940.

References
 

Mountains of Marie Byrd Land